Cantor (or Kantur) Church, is a Russian Orthodox church in Qazvin, Iran.

History and design
The church was built in 1905 for the Russians engineers hired for road constructions in Qazvin. The chapel, like other churches, has a cruciform plan with the altar facing east. The entrance is surrounded by two walls adorned with crosses. There is a three-storey bell-house at the entrance that is bounded by a small dome. Hall includes a chapel and altar, and on both sides, are two rectangular areas. The altar is in the shape of a half circle covered over the dome. Regarding the exterior of the church, decorative columns can be seen.
Its architectural planning is based upon an irregular polygon made out of red bricks. The first floor of the bell tower of the chapel gives great views of the surrounding field. The paved churchyard leads to many tombs, one of which belongs to a Russian pilot who was killed when his plane went down during the war. In front of the church is a memorial to a Russian road engineer. The church is sometimes referred to as the "Cantor" or "Kantur" church from the name of the area where it stands.

Gallery

See also
 Russians in Iran
 St. Nicholas Church, Tehran

References

Iran–Russia relations
Christian denominations established in the 20th century
Russian Orthodox church buildings in Iran
Russian Orthodox Church Outside of Russia